The Africa Movie Academy Award for Best Soundtrack is an annual merit by the Africa Film Academy to reward the best use of music in a film for the year. It was introduced in the 1st edition as Best Musical Score. In the 3rd, 5th and 6th edition it was renamed to Best Original Soundtrack. It was known as Best Music in the 4th edition. In the 7th edition it was called Best Soundtrack. Since the 8th edition it has been called Achievement in Soundtrack.

References

Lists of award winners
Africa Movie Academy Awards
Film music awards